Bilateral relations between Cambodia and Singapore were established on 10 August 1965. The two countries' relations continue to strengthen; Cambodia has an embassy in Singapore and vice versa. Cambodia was one of the first countries to recognize Singapore's sovereignty when it was expelled from Malaysia in 1965. Both countries are members of ASEAN.

Singapore's diplomatic (recognition of the Coalition Government of Democratic Kampuchea) and military support for the armed factions - including the Khmer Rouge - that had opposed the pro-Vietnamese government in 1980s, after the Vietnamese forces had toppled Pol Pot in 1979, has occasionally raised tensions nowadays, too.

See also 
 Foreign relations of Cambodia
 Foreign relations of Singapore

References 

 
Singapore
Bilateral relations of Singapore